Indian Camp Creek Park is a public park in Foristell, Missouri. It is located in the northwestern part of St. Charles County and is operated by the St. Charles County Parks Department. It is the county's largest park at 603 acres.

The park opened in 2006, five years after the bulk of its land was donated. It is named for Indian Camp Creek, which meets with Big Creek within the park. The parks department puts much focus on maintaining and emphasizing the environmental heritage of the area.

Amenities 
The park features about 10 miles of trails, paved and unpaved, for walking, cycling, horseback riding, and inline skating.

Other amenities include an eco-playground, a former silo turned into an observation tower, a nature preserve, camping grounds, a six-acre fishing pond, and an 18-hole disc golf course.

The remains of a log cabin and the Cannon family cemetery, both from the 1800s, are preserved in the park.

See also 
 Towne Park, a park and former plantation in Foristell, Missouri
 Daniel Boone Home, an assembled historic village operated by the St. Charles County Parks Department

References 

Parks in St. Charles County, Missouri
2006 establishments in Missouri